Tien Shiau-wen (born 14 December 1999) is a Taiwanese table tennis player.

Tien was born in Kaohsiung on 14 December 1999, and was raised on Liuqiu Island. The nerves in her right hand were damaged at birth, and she was bullied by classmates who noticed that she had limited use of that hand. Tien began playing table tennis at the age of nine. She won two silver medals at the 2018 Asian Para Games, in the individual table tennis competition for class 10, and the women's class 8–10 team event alongside Lin Tzu-yu. At the 2020 Summer Paralympics, Tien medaled in the Class 10 individual women's table tennis, winning bronze.

References

1999 births
Table tennis players at the 2020 Summer Paralympics
Living people
Paralympic bronze medalists for Chinese Taipei
Sportspeople from Kaohsiung
People from Pingtung County
Paralympic table tennis players of Chinese Taipei
Taiwanese female table tennis players
21st-century Taiwanese women